Lang Suan is a district (amphoe) of Chumphon province, southern Thailand.

History
Lang Suan was originally a mueang reporting directly to Bangkok. During the Thesaphiban reforms at the end of the 19th century it was put under monthon Chumphon. On 29 April 1917 the district's name was changed from Mueang Lang Suan to Khan Ngein (ขันเงิน). On 1 April 1932 the province was abolished and its districts were incorporated into Chumphon province. On 14 November 1938 the district's name was changed to Lang Suan (หลังสวน).

Geography
Neighboring districts are (from the south clockwise) Lamae and Phato of Chumphon Province, La-un of Ranong province, and Sawi and Thung Tako of Chumphon. To the east is the Gulf of Thailand.

The main river of the district is the Lang Suan.

Administration
The district is divided into 13 sub-districts (tambons), which are further subdivided into 147 villages (mubans). The town (thesaban mueang) Lang Suan includes the tambon Lang Suan and parts of Khan Ngoen, Pho Daeng, Laem Sai, and Wang Tako. The sub-district municipality (thesaban tambon) Paknam Lang Suan includes tambon Pak Nam. There are a further 12 tambon administrative organizations (TAO).

References

External links
amphoe.com (Thai)

Districts of Chumphon province
Former provinces of Thailand